Friends III is the sixth mini-album by the Japanese rock duo B'z. It was released on December 8, 2021. It's a concept album and is a sequel to their previous mini-album, Friends II, released in 1996.

The mini-album came in three editions: a standard edition, a first press edition with a DVD featuring a re-recording of their song "Itsuka no Merry Christmas" from their fourth mini-album, Friends, and a special Live Friends box featuring the standard edition with a glass, which was only available to those who purchased live tickets and was only sold through B'z Club-Gym.

The mini-album debuted at number one on both the Oricon weekly albums chart and on the Billboard Japan Hot Albums chart.

Background 
During the COVID-19 pandemic, guitarist Tak Matsumoto went back and forth between Japan and the United States. During a mandatory isolation after returning to Japan, he decided to make one song a day. The songs produced matched up to the style of the past Friends mini-albums, which led Matsumoto to propose producing a third entry into the series, to which vocalist Koshi Inaba agreed.

Track listing 

Limited Edition DVD

Charts

Certifications

References 

2021 EPs
B'z EPs
Japanese-language EPs